Raise A Child Inc. (AKA RaiseAChild.US) is a 501(c)(3) nonprofit organization, providing support and services to all prospective parents interested in building families through fostering and adoption to meet the needs of the 415,000 children in the foster care system. RaiseAChild.US has become one of the first national lesbian, gay, bisexual, and transgender (LGBT) organizations to welcome and serve people of all orientations and identities. Based in Los Angeles, California, with a regional office in Port St. Lucie, Florida, RaiseAChild.US recruits, educates, and nurtures supportive relationships with all prospective foster and adoptive parents while partnering with agencies to improve the process of advancing foster children to safe, loving, and permanent homes.

References

External links 

 Official website

Adoption-related organizations
LGBT parenting in the United States
Foster care in the United States
501(c)(3) organizations